James Forrest (14 December 1921 – 4 July 2010) was a South African cricketer. He played one first-class match for Transvaal in 1952/53.

References

External links
 

1921 births
2010 deaths
South African cricketers
Gauteng cricketers
Cricketers from Ipswich
Suffolk cricketers